Penbrooke Meadows is a residential neighbourhood in the southeast quadrant of Calgary, Alberta. It is bounded by Memorial Drive to the north, 68 Street E to the east, 52 Street E to the west and 17 Avenue SE to the south and is  part of the International Avenue Business Revitalization Zone.

The area was annexed by Calgary in 1961 and Penbrooke Meadows was established in 1969. It is represented in the Calgary City Council by the Ward 9 councillor.

The postal code in this area is T2A.

Demographics

Residents in this community had a median household income of $49,602 in 2000, and there were 24.5% low income residents living in the neighbourhood. As of 2000, 32.6% of the residents were immigrants. A proportion of 3% of the buildings were condominiums or apartments, and 29.6% of the housing was used for renting.

Education
The community is served by G.W. Skene Elementary, James Short Memorial Elementary and Penbrooke Meadows Elementary public schools, as well as by St. Peter Elementary School (Catholic).

See also
List of neighbourhoods in Calgary

References

External links
Penbrooke Meadows Community Association

Neighbourhoods in Calgary